Scapaniaceae is a family of liverworts in order Jungermanniales. The family has been extended to include the former family Lophoziaceae.

References

External links

 
Liverwort families